Paddington-Waverley was an electoral district of the Legislative Assembly in the Australian state of New South Wales. It was created in 1959, when Paddington and part of Waverley were merged. Paddington-Waverley was abolished in 1962 and partly replaced by Bligh.

Members for Paddington-Waverley

Election results

1961

1959

References

Paddington-Waverley